The grey-headed spinetail (Cranioleuca semicinerea) is a species of bird in the family Furnariidae. It is endemic to Brazil.

Its natural habitat is subtropical or tropical dry forests.

References

grey-headed spinetail
Birds of the Caatinga
Birds of the Cerrado
Endemic birds of Brazil
grey-headed spinetail
Taxonomy articles created by Polbot
Taxa named by Ludwig Reichenbach